Andrew Pickens Jr. (December 13, 1779June 24, 1838) was an American soldier and politician. He served as the 46th Governor of South Carolina from 1816 until 1818.

Pickens was the son of well-known American Revolutionary general Andrew Pickens (1739–1817), and Rebecca Floride Pickens (nee Colhoun). He was born on his father's plantation on the Savannah River in Horse Creek Valley in Edgefield County, South Carolina.

He was a maternal cousin of fellow South Carolina politician John C. Calhoun. He was also a paternal cousin of Calhoun's wife Floride.

Pickens attended Brown University, graduating in 1801. He served as a lieutenant-colonel in the U.S. Army during the War of 1812. After the war, he established a plantation, "Oatlands", in Edgefield County, and took up the practice of law. He also established a residence, "Halcyon Grove", in the village of Edgefield, and married Susannah Smith Wilkinson.

On December 5, 1816, the South Carolina General Assembly elected Pickens as governor by secret ballot. Pickens championed the construction of roads and canals by government, a policy called internal improvements. During his administration, South Carolina began an internal improvements program. The price of cotton rose to the highest point reached in South Carolina during the antebellum period. The city of Charleston was struck with a disastrous yellow fever epidemic. After leaving office, Pickens moved to Alabama and helped negotiate a treaty with the Creek Indians of Georgia. For a period of time around 1829, he lived in Augusta. Growing up living by Indians, he had a very tight bond with them.

Pickens died June 24, 1838, in Pontotoc, Mississippi, and was interred at Old Stone Church Cemetery in Clemson, South Carolina.

His son, Francis Wilkinson Pickens (1805–1869) was a U.S. Representative and the Governor of South Carolina when the state seceded from the Union in 1860.

External links

SCIway Biography of Andrew Pickens
NGA Biography of Andrew Pickens

1779 births
1838 deaths
United States Army personnel of the War of 1812
Governors of South Carolina
People from Edgefield County, South Carolina
Brown University alumni
American people of Scotch-Irish descent
United States Army colonels
University of South Carolina trustees
South Carolina Democratic-Republicans
Democratic-Republican Party state governors of the United States